The  2010 RoadRunner Turbo Indy 300 was the tenth running of the Kansas Indy 300 and the fifth round of the 2010 IndyCar Series season. It took place on Saturday, May 1, 2010. The race was contested over 200 laps at the  Kansas Speedway in Kansas City, Kansas, and was telecast by ABC in the United States.

The race was won by Scott Dixon who led 167 laps on the way to his 22nd career victory.  Dixon's teammate Dario Franchitti completed a Ganassi 1-2 finish, with Tony Kanaan third for Andretti Autosport.


Classification

Qualifying

1. Both Dan Wheldon (Originally qualified 3rd) and Marco Andretti (11th) were sent to the rear of the field due to dropping below the white line on their qualifying runs. They were placed ahead of Mario Romancini who did not attempt a qualifying run.

Race

Championship standings after the race

Drivers' Championship standings

 Note: Only the top five positions are included.

References 

Kansas Indy 300
RoadRunner Turbo Indy 300
RoadRunner Turbo Indy 300
RoadRunner Turbo Indy 300